The 1983 TAME Boeing 737 crash is the deadliest aviation accident in the Ecuador, which a Boeing 737-2V2 Advanced, operated by the Ecuadorian national airline TAME, which was flying on a domestic route from the now-closed Mariscal Sucre International Airport in Quito to Mariscal Lamar Airport in Cuenca, crashed into a hill during final approach just  from its final destination, killing all 119 people on board.

The crash was the first and deadliest crash in the history of TAME, and it remains as the deadliest plane crash in the history of Ecuador. An investigation later determined that the flight crashed due to the flight crews lack of experience on the aircraft type, which caused a controlled flight into terrain.

Aircraft
The aircraft involved in the accident was a Boeing 737-2V2 Advanced, with Pratt & Whitney type JT8D-17 engines. It was manufactured in 1981 and made its first flight on 11 June of that year. When Boeing delivered it, it was registered as N8283V, but when it arrived in the TAME fleet in October of the same year, its registration changed to HC-BIG. The aircraft was named "Ciudad de Loja" upon its delivery to TAME. It was the only Boeing 737 ever operated by the airline. The plane was piloted by captain Jorge Peña and an unnamed first officer. 103 people (95 passengers and all eight crew) came from Ecuador, 11 came from Colombia, and five from the United States.

Flight history 

On the morning of 11 July 1983, the aircraft took off from Mariscal Sucre International Airport in Quito for a domestic flight to Mariscal Lamar Airport in Cuenca with 111 passengers and eight crew members. The aircraft encountered foggy conditions during the final approach to Mariscal Lamar Airport, but the weather conditions of that day were reported as clear. The crew contacted the Cuenca control tower for permission to land the plane, which was granted.

During the final few minutes of the flight, the pilots were distracted during a conversation (reportedly discussing labor problems in TAME) and didn't know that the plane was flying dangerously low towards a mountain. Also, at the same time, they were experimenting with some of the aircraft's controls and systems.

The captain and first officer attempted to climb clear of the mountain by applying full power on the engines and making a steep climb, but it was too late. The jetliner scraped the peak of Bashún Hill (which overlooks the runway of Marsical Lamar Airport), exploded, and slid down into a ravine; there were no survivors.

Two minutes after the plane signal was lost from the radar screen, Cuenca air traffic control (ATC) declared an emergency. The following day, search aircraft and rescue teams arrived at the plane's last known position. Because of the remoteness and the difficulty of access to the crash site, it took rescue personnel several hours to reach the site itself.

Investigation
Initial fears of a possible sabotage were advanced by the civil aviation authorities after a radio station reported witnesses to a mid-air explosion. During the investigation, this was discarded due to lack of evidence. The civil authorities of aviation initiated an investigation, with cooperation of Boeing, Pratt & Whitney and the United States National Transportation Safety Board (NTSB).

The investigation results were presented several months later and concluded that pilot error was a direct cause in the crash. Several factors were identified: training of the pilots was not properly delivered by TAME for the Boeing 737-2V2 Advanced, the crew was not fully familiar with the controls of the aircraft, and the crew was distracted while trying to locate the runway in heavy fog, as a consequence, the plane went below the minimum safe altitude in a mountainous region with the flight crew ignoring the voice commands of the proximity radar until seconds before impact.

See also
SAM Colombia Flight 501
American Airlines Flight 965
Air China Flight 129
Mount Erebus disaster
Smolensk air disaster
TWA Flight 3
Bhoja Air Flight 213
Prinair Flight 277
Avianca Flight 410
TAME Flight 120

References

Accidents and incidents involving the Boeing 737 Original
Aviation accidents and incidents in 1983
Aviation accidents and incidents in Ecuador
TAME accidents and incidents
1983 in Ecuador
July 1983 events in South America
Airliner accidents and incidents involving controlled flight into terrain
Airliner accidents and incidents caused by weather
Airliner accidents and incidents caused by pilot error
Airliner accidents and incidents involving fog
1983 disasters in Ecuador